Pawn Stars UK was a British reality television series which debuted on 26 August 2013 on the British version of the History channel and ran until 10 November 2014. The series is filmed in Sealand, Flintshire in Wales, and chronicles the day-to-day activities of pawn shop Regal Pawn, collaboratively run by Mark Andrew Manning, Mark Lever Holland, Marco Peter Holland, Simon Penworth, and Vicki Manning.

A spin-off of the prominent American reality television series Pawn Stars (2009–present), the show's format is similar to the latter show, as it features an array of collectible, antique and unusual items that people sell or pawn. In 2015, the Regal Pawn store where the show is set went bankrupt. It permanently closed its doors and a request was made to "strike off" the company at Companies House. The last time the premises were mentioned online, it was available for purchase through local estate agents.

Production history and format
Following the success of Pawn Stars, Leftfield Pictures decided to produce a few spin-offs of it. Pawn Stars UK is the fourth spin-off of Pawn Stars.

The development of Pawn Stars UK was announced in October 2012, after A&E Networks and A&E Networks UK jointly agreed on a British edition of Pawn Stars. Executive producer Brent Montgomery opined that it would be "a natural extension of the [Pawn Stars] brand". Casting was completed in the same month, and production commenced in the final quarter of 2012. Pawn Stars UK debuted in the UK on 26 August 2013.

The show has a format in the style of Pawn Stars. It follows the daily operations of Regal Pawn, where the show is shot on location. Customers are mostly shown selling or pawning "amazing historically significant items". Deals and other interactions with customers in the show are handled by the main shop staff. At times when the cast are uncertain about a certain item's authenticity or value, on-screen experts are called on to appraise the item. As of September 2013, two experts have been featured on the show – Robert "The Robster" Fiddaman, a music enthusiast, and Stewart Knight "Midge" Myzylowskyj, a gun expert.

Cast
 Mark Andrew "Big Jew" Manning – Born and raised in Norton Canes, Staffordshire, Manning "worked in a crematorium, [...] sold double glazing and worked for solicitors", among others, prior to establishing Regal Pawn. He is married with seven children and four grandchildren. 
 Mark Lever "Little Mark" Holland – Manning's best friend. Born in Wallasey and raised in South Africa, Holland enjoyed a short stint at the army and joined Regal Pawn once it was established.
 Mark Peter "Marco" Holland – Born 17 September 1990, he is Holland's son. The younger Holland was born in Wales. He used to work as a trainee chef before joining Regal Pawn. Marco is the shops expert in firearms and deactivated weapons.
 Vicki Manning – Born in Cannock, Vicki is Mark Manning's daughter (2nd) and she serves as shop manager at Regal Pawn. Prior to that she did various jobs, including managing a fish pedicure outlet and manufacturing computers. She is single with one son. Metro described her in September 2013 as "Pawn Star UK's Golden Girl".
 Simon "Ebeneezer" Penworth – One of Regal Pawn's staff who specialises in militaria and auction house selling. He used to be a high-up figure in a well-known high street chain before semi-retiring and joining the gang for valuations and road shows.
 Liam "The New Kid" – 16-year-old Liam joined the cast for season 2 after he was hired to work at the shop while he was looking for a job there. He is very enthusiastic about history and sports and is always trying to learn more about the business.

References

External links
  of Regal Pawn

2010s British reality television series
2013 British television series debuts
History (European TV channel) original programming
Television shows set in Wales
Pawn Stars
British television series based on American television series